Mo i Rana Airport is a regional airport serving the town of Mo i Rana in the municipality of Rana in Nordland county, Norway. The airport is located about  outside the town in the village of Røssvoll.  In 2014 Mo i Rana Airport served 104,474 passengers. It is operated by Avinor.

Service
The airport is served by Widerøe with Dash 8 aircraft connecting the community to Bodø, Trondheim, and other communities in Nordland and Nord-Trøndelag counties. The routes are operated on public service obligation with the Norwegian Ministry of Transport and Communications. The runway is too short for flights with enough fuel to reach Oslo (in 2017 flights with a fuel stop were introduced).

Airlines and destinations

Statistics

Ground transportation
The airport is located in Røssvoll about 20 minutes north-east of the town along the E6. There are no buses to the airport, but taxis are available. Rental cars are available in the town of Mo i Rana.

Future

Since at least 2002 there has been ideas of building an airport near Mo i Rana and nearby cities with a large enough runway to fly mid-size jet aircraft directly to Oslo, and thereby reducing the cost of travel to Northern Helgeland. It's not possible to extend the present short runway at Røssvoll. There has been support in principle from the government, but it took several years of delays and redoing plans, but in March 2021 the plans were given go-ahead. On 26 september 2022, construction works started with a ceremony.

References

Airports in Nordland
Avinor airports
Rana, Norway
1968 establishments in Norway
Airports established in 1968
Mo i Rana